The European Radio Amateurs' Organization (EURAO), established in 2005, is an association of independent amateur radio associations in Europe. The association focuses on the individuals engaged in the amateur radio hobby, rather than the hobby itself, and so it includes members from outside Europe.

History

In 2005 the first idea of EURAO arise and immediately several European radio amateurs' associations started to strengthen their relationship and to work together, becoming a de facto association.

In 2009 these associations constituted a Promoters Committee with the aim to do the necessary steps to fully legalize the Organization.

In 2010 the EuroBureauQSL service was launched like a coordinated network of QSL bureaus members already run.

In 2011 the first face to face Meeting took place in Barcelona (Spain).

In 2012 was the international official presentation at HAM RADIO fair, in Friedrichshafen (Germany).

In 2013 the first Statutes were approved and a Board of Directors elected.

In 2014 the headquarters was moved from Belgium to France, becoming a registered/declared association under the law of 1 July 1901.

In 2015 a LoU was signed with CEPT/ECC.

In 2016 EURAO participated in two CEPT/ECC/WGFM meetings: in Helsinki and Bordeaux.

In 2017 EURAO had the first formal meeting with IARU Region 1.

In 2018 the ECOSOC of the United Nations endorsed the special consultative status to EURAO.

In 2019 EURAO  was admitted as a Radiocommunications Sector member of ITU.

Membership

EURAO has three categories of members: associations, individuals and clubs&groups.

Different conditions and fees apply for each category. All of them have the right of voice. Only associations have voting rights.

General Assembly

All members of the Organization.

Board of Directors

The current members of the Board of Directors are:
 
 President: Petrica, YO9RIJ
 Vice-president: 
 Secretary-General: Sam, EA3CIW
 Treasurer: Joan Lluís, EA3CWZ

References

External links 
 EURAO web site 
 EuroBureauQSL: the EURAO's QSL Bureaus Global Network

Amateur radio organizations
Organizations established in 2005